The 2017 season was Chelsea Ladies Football Club's 25th season of competitive football and its seventh season in the FA Women's Super League and at the top level of English women's football, being one of the league's foundation clubs.

Following a reorganisation of top-level women's football in England, the 2017 season only covered half of a traditional season's length, while the FA WSL shifted its calendar to match the traditional autumn-to-spring axis of football in Europe. For the same reason, there was no Champions League qualification nor relegation to be competed for.

First team

New contracts

Transfers and loans

Transfers in

Transfers out

Loans out

Pre-season

Competitions

Women's Super League

Results summary

Results by matchday

Matches

FA Cup

Honours

 2017 BBC Women's Footballer of the Year:  Hedvig Lindahl (finalist)
 2016–17 PFA Players' Player of the Year:  Karen Carney (finalist)
 2016–17 PFA Young Player of the Year:  Millie Bright (finalist)
 2016–17 PFA Team of the Year:  Eniola Aluko,  Karen Carney
 2016–17 FA Cup Player of the Round:  Ramona Bachmann (sixth round)
 Football Black List:  Eniola Aluko

References

2017